Yongxin may refer to:

 Shi Yongxin, a Chinese monk
 Yang Yongxin, a Chinese psychiatrist
 Yongxin County, in Jiangxi, China
 Yongxin, Shimen (永兴街道), a subdistrict in Shimen County, Hunan Province, China.